The 1908 Ohio Green and White football team represented Ohio University in the 1908 college football season as an independent. Led by third-year head coach Arthur McFarland, the Green and White compiled a record of 3–5, but outscored opponents 100–65.

Schedule

References

Ohio
Ohio Bobcats football seasons
Ohio Green and White football